Renata George (Akhunova) (4 November 1981) is an entrepreneur turned venture capitalist based in the United States.

Biography
Renata George (Akhunova) was born on 4 November 1981. She is a Managing Partner of IZBA Ventures, a VC firm funding outstanding entrepreneurs in financial tech, SaaS, platforms, etc.
Prior to that, she was a managing partner of MR Ventures, a VC firm investing in startups working in property tech, financial tech, SaaS verticals, platforms, etc., after working as a managing director of the corporate venture capital arm of Wifi Master, an Asian "unicorn" startup headquartered in Singapore. Earlier, she was a co-founding managing partner, of the venture capital fund FormulaVC, formed in 2012. In 2013–2015, Ms. George also served as the Advisory Board Member at 500 Startups, and then, the Head of the US Office of Life.SREDA, a fintech focused venture capital fund.

George was the only Russian female venture capitalist mentioned Forbes.com's list of the Top Women in Venture Capital and Angel Investment.

She was featured on the list of 20 Women Millennials in Venture Capital in the United States, which was also published on Forbes.com.

Ms. George led first of its kind research on the investment performance of women venture capitalists in the US through a think tank Women.vc, founded in 2014. In partnership with PE Hub and Venture Capital Journal, she discovered that the performance of women venture investors is on par or above average in the industry.

Among other findings, she also discovered that the most popular way for women to become investment partners is by establishing their own venture capital firms. Based on these findings, she co-founded the first online school on venture capital VC.Academy  that covers the entire cycle of venture capital investing with the goal of facilitating careers in venture capital.

She started her career in media in 2001, as a regional chief commercial officer at one of the largest radio stations in Russia, and then, in the same position at the Kommersant publishing house. After working for different media outlets, she founded The First Publishing house, in 2003, a publishing company producing several lifestyle magazines. In 2007 Renata Akhunova was nominated for the Media Manager Award for the founding of the one of the fastest growing media franchise in Eastern Europe.

After selling her business in 2008, Akhunova became an angel investor and started consulting various state and regional agencies on different matters regarding the development of the innovation and investment infrastructure and entrepreneurial community in Eastern Europe.

In 2010-2011 she reviewed and evaluated more than 11,000 tech startups for prospective private investments and grants and helped them raise ~$30M from development institutions, as well as ~$20M from private investors. She then moved to the United States to help some of these startups grow in the US market.

In 2004, she graduated from Kursk State Medical University with specializations in economy and management. The same year she graduated from Kursk Institute of Management, Economy, and Business with specializations in government relations.

Akhunova works and lives in the United States.

Bibliography
 'Venture Capital Mindset' (2018)
 'Women Who Venture' (2019)

References

1981 births
Living people
Polish businesspeople
Russian venture capitalists